Janne is a common given name in the Nordic countries. In Denmark, Norway and Estonia it is considered a feminine name, while in Sweden and Finland it is considered masculine. In Sweden and Finland it is often used as a nickname for people with related (male) names such as Jan, Jean or Johan.

The name's origins lie in the ancient Hebrew names Yohanah/Yohanan (feminine/masculine), meaning "Yahweh (God) is gracious". The name spread to Greece along with Christianity, and became Ioanna/Ioannes. In the original, Greek version of the Bible both John the Baptist and John the apostle are referred to as "Ioannes", and the feminine version of the name appears in "Ioanna, the wife of Chuza". The names then, through Latin Vulgate, became Joanna/Johanna/Johanne (feminine), and Johannes (masculine).

As the names spread through Europe along with Christianity, a number of simplified derivatives appeared, resulting in the large family of names to which Janne belongs: Johanna, John, Jan, Joan, Jahn, Johan, Juan, Jane, Jean (male) and Jean (female), Jeanne, Jonas, Janusz, Hannes, Hans and so forth.

A selection of people carrying the name (or nickname):

Janne Ahonen, Finnish ski jumper
Janne Aikala, Finnish schoolboy, murdered
Janne Blomqvist, Finnish freestyle swimmer
Jan "Janne" Boklöv, Swedish ski jumper
Janne Puurtinen known as "Burton". Finnish keyboardist member of HIM
Janne Wirman, Finnish keyboardist, member of Children of Bodom.
Janne Haaland Matlary, Norwegian politician and professor in international politics.
Janne Rønningen, Norwegian comedian and TV-presenter.
Janne Heiskanen, Finnish drummer, member of Lovestone
Janne Korpi, Finnish snowboarder
Janne Mäkelä, Finnish footballer
Janne Niinimaa, Finnish ice hockey defenceman
Janne Nilsson, Swedish politician
Jan "Janne" Schaffer, Swedish guitarist
Johan "Janne" Ståhlberg, Finnish priest and the father of President K. J. Ståhlberg

Given names
Danish feminine given names
Estonian feminine given names
Finnish masculine given names
Norwegian feminine given names
Swedish masculine given names